Samuel Jason Fell (born 22 November 1965) is a British animator, director, screenwriter and voice actor.

Sam started his career as director on the short film The Big Cheese for 3 Peach Animation. He then joined Aardman Animations and worked on projects like Pop, Peter Lord's Oscar-nominated short film Wat's Pig, as well as Rex the Runt, before directing the 2002 project Chump. He also developed a children's TV series called Rabbits!.

In 2001, he came up with the story of Flushed Away which he developed through 2002. From 2003, he went on to direct (with David Bowers) the film for Aardman. He also provided the voices for the characters Liam, The Prophet, Ladykiller and Fanseller.

From 2008, he went on to direct The Tale of Despereaux for Universal Studios, and also provided the voices of the characters Ned and Smudge.

Fell co-directed Laika's ParaNorman, with Chris Butler, which was released in the United States in August 2012.

Filmography
Short films

Television

Film

Voice roles

References

External links

1965 births
Living people
British animated film directors
British animators
English film directors
English male voice actors
People from Stratford-upon-Avon
People from the Isle of Sheppey